Neil Griffiths (born 12 October 1951) is an English former footballer who played at left-back for Chester, Port Vale, Crewe Alexandra, Stafford Rangers, Macclesfield Town, and Newcastle Town. He also briefly managed Macclesfield Town.

Career
Griffiths began his career at Ken Roberts's Chester, who missed out on the Fourth Division promotion places by one point and one place in 1970–71. They then dropped to just one point and one place above the re-election zone in 1971–72, before finishing in 15th place in 1972–73. He scored five goals in 90 league games during his time at Sealand Road. He joined Gordon Lee's Port Vale in exchange for £5,000 and Tony Loska in December 1973.

He played 24 Third Division and two FA Cup games in the 1973–74 season. He fell out of favour under new manager Roy Sproson, playing just 12 league games in the 1974–75 campaign. He featured 35 times in the 1975–76 season, and scored his first goal for the "Valiants" in a 1–1 draw with Hereford United at Vale Park on 3 April. He made 40 appearances in the 1976–77 campaign, and scored one goal in a 3–0 home win over Barnsley to send Vale through to the Third Round of the FA Cup. He played 40 games in the 1977–78 relegation season, and claimed three goals from the penalty spot after being appointed as the club's penalty taker by new boss Bobby Smith. He lined up against Chester in the final of the 1977 Debenhams Cup and scored an own goal in what ended as a 4–1 defeat. He scored one goal in 27 matches in the 1978–79 season, as the club struggled in the Fourth Division under new manager Dennis Butler. He went on to score four goals in 41 games in the 1979–80 season, keeping his first team place as the club switched managers from Butler to Alan Bloor and then John McGrath. He scored three goals in 25 games in the 1980–81 season, and was given a free transfer in May 1981.

Griffiths moved on to Crewe Alexandra, and scored one goal in 34 Fourth Division games as the "Railwaymen" finished bottom of the Football League in 1981–82 under the stewardship of his namesake Arfon Griffiths. He then departed Gresty Road and played Alliance Premier League football for Stafford Rangers, before joining Northern Premier League club Macclesfield Town in 1983. He served the club as a player in the 1983–84 season, as player-coach in 1984–85, and then as manager in 1985–86 before he resigned to join Newcastle Town in February 1986.

Career statistics
Source:

Honours
Port Vale
Debenhams Cup runner up: 1977

References

1951 births
Living people
Footballers from Stoke-on-Trent
English footballers
Association football fullbacks
Chester City F.C. players
Port Vale F.C. players
Crewe Alexandra F.C. players
Stafford Rangers F.C. players
Macclesfield Town F.C. players
Newcastle Town F.C. players
English Football League players
National League (English football) players
Northern Premier League players
English football managers
Macclesfield Town F.C. managers
Northern Premier League managers
Association football coaches